Christos Zanteroglou (12 July 1940 – 4 March 2023) was a Greek footballer who played as a defender. He played in 13 matches for the Greece national team from 1964 to 1969.

Zanteroglou died on 4 March 2023, at the age of 82. He has the record with 164 consecutive appearances at the first Greek League.

References

External links

1940 births
2023 deaths
People from Magnesia (regional unit)
Greek footballers
Association football defenders
Greece international footballers
Super League Greece players
Football League (Greece) players
Niki Volos F.C. players
Olympiacos F.C. players
Egaleo F.C. players
Atromitos F.C. players